"It's All the Way Live (Now)" is a song by American rapper Coolio. It was released in May 1996 as the lead single to the Eddie soundtrack. The song became Coolio's fifth top-40 single and his fourth to achieve at least a gold certification from the RIAA for sales of 500,000 copies. The song sampled "It's All the Way Live" by funk band Lakeside, his second single to both sample and take the name from a Lakeside song after his 1994 hit, "Fantastic Voyage".

Despite being one of Coolio's biggest hits, the song did not appear on his 2001 Tommy Boy Records Greatest Hits compilation. This was due to the fact Hollywood Records, who released the Eddie soundtrack, owned the rights to the song.

Critical reception
British magazine Music Week rated the song three out of five, describing it as "a smoothly-produced cover" from the new basketball comedy Eddie. They also noted that the original recorders, Lakeside, perform on the track too.

Single track listing
"It's All the Way Live (Now)" – 3:36 
"1, 2, 3, 4 (Sumpin' New)" (Timber mix) – 3:21

Charts

Weekly charts

Year-end charts

References

1996 singles
Coolio songs
1996 songs
Hollywood Records singles